The Movement for Democracy in Africa (MDA) is a political party in Burkina Faso.

History
The MDA was established in November 2014. In the 2015 general elections it received 0.58% of the vote, winning one of the constituency seats (party president Amadou Tall in Loroum Province).

References

2014 establishments in Burkina Faso
Political parties established in 2014
Political parties in Burkina Faso